The Iran Eurasia Research Institute, also known as the Institute of Iran Eurasian Research Institute (Iras), is an independent, private, non-partisan, non-governmental organization in Iran, Tehran. The Institute has an office in Moscow, Russia. The organization aims to study Central Asia, the Caucuses, Russia, and Iran's Eastern neighbors. The chairman of the Institute is Mehdi Sanaei, Current Iranian Ambassador to the Russian Federation and an associate professor at the Department of Russian Studies, University of Tehran. The deputy chairman is Mandana Tisheyar (PhD. JNU).

On its website, Iras regularly offers updates, analysis, and policy briefs pertaining to the region, or through the academic journals and Monographs it regularly publishes. Articles on the website are published in Persian, English, and Russian.

The Institute has two main structures:
 The Cultural/Scientific Committee, consisting of well-known academics in the field and former or current diplomats on mission in the studied regions, who help to guide the institute. The members of this committee are policy makers of Iras.
 The Authors Council, consisting of younger political analysts working as junior researchers and contributing to the Institute's Research Agendas.

References 

Research institutes in Iran
Think tanks based in Iran